Schottarum is a genus of flowering plants belonging to the family Araceae.

The genus is found in Borneo.

The genus name of Schottarum is in honour of Heinrich Wilhelm Schott (1794–1865), an Austrian botanist well known for his extensive work on aroids (Family Araceae). 
It was first described and published in Bot. Stud. (Taipei) Vol.49 on page 393 in 2008.

Known species
According to Kew:
 Schottarum josefii 
 Schottarum sarikeense

References

Aroideae
Plants described in 2008
Flora of Borneo
Araceae genera